Karkuh, also rendered as Karku, may refer to:
 Karkuh, Mazandaran (كاركوه - Kārkūh) - village in Iran
 Karkuh, Sistan and Baluchestan (كركوه - Karkūh) - another village, in a different province of Iran

See also
 Karkú, Chilean television series